Love U Family is an Indian family-drama film, presented by Bharat Shah  written and directed by Sachindra Sharma and produced by Vipul Diwani and D S Bhatia under the banner of Khushi Motion pictures. Screenplay by Sachindra Sharma and Shahid Khan .
 The film stars Salman Yusuff Khan, Aksha Pardasany and Kashyap in lead roles while Shakti Kapoor and National Award-winning actor Manoj Joshi will also be seen in the film. The film was released on 9 June 2017.

Cast 
 Salman Yusuff Khan as Raj
 Sunil Gupta as Sunil Gupta
 Rima Mishra as Rama
 Aksha Pardasany as Khushi
 Kashyap Barbhaya as Avi
 Manoj Joshi as Dhiren Devani
 Shakti Kapoor as Lovely Singh

Music
"Ishq Ne Aisa Shunk Baja Ya" - Sonu Nigam, Madhushree
"Love U Family" - Madhushree, Vikrant Singh, Mridul Ghosh, Soumya, Robby Badal
"Maa" - Madhushree
"Naughty Naughty Party" - Naresh Iyer, Vishnu Narayan
"Peg Sheg" - Daler Mehndi, Kalpana Patowary, Vishnu Narayan
"Sar Se Paon Tak" - Prathamesh Tambe  
'Tune Chhua - Baras Jaa" - Zubin Garg, Meghna Yagnik

References

2010s Hindi-language films